USS Guide is the name of the following ships of the U.S. Navy:

 , was a coastal minesweeper launched 20 September 1941
 . was a minesweeper launched 17 April 1954

United States Navy ship names